The Azalea Trail Run is an annual road running event held in late March in Mobile, Alabama which is considered one of the United States' premier road races. Runners, walkers, and wheelchair athletes from around the world and at all levels turn out for the event. The 10-kilometer race is known for its fast, flat course along Mobile's oak shaded streets and has seen blistering records set by runners since its inception. The 2023 race will be the 45th annual running.

In 2001, Joseph Kimani of Kenya finished within two seconds of setting a new world record in the men's open division in 27:41. John Campbell of New Zealand established a world’s best time for a male masters athlete (over 50 years of age) in 1999 with his time of 31:02. In 1994, Martin Mondragon of Mexico set the current world record for men masters, at 28:56.

The two-day, family-friendly event was founded in 1978 and includes a world class 10K race, a 5K race, a fun run, and a Health and Fitness Expo. The ATR is produced by the Port City Pacers, a local nonprofit organization with the mission of promoting health and fitness through running and walking. 2,000 participants attended the 2015 race.

Past winners
Key:

Wins by country

References

List of winners
Post, Marty (2010-03-30). Azalea Trail 10 km. Association of Road Racing Statisticians. Retrieved on 2010-12-09.

External links
Official website
Port City Pacers

Sports in Mobile, Alabama
10K runs in the United States
1978 establishments in Alabama
Events in Mobile, Alabama